Zhuozi is a county of Ulanqab prefecture-level city, which in turn is part of Inner Mongolia, China.

Climate

References

County-level divisions of Inner Mongolia
Ulanqab